Elephantopus elatus, common name tall elephantsfoot, is a North American species of flowering plant in the sunflower family. It is native to the southeastern United States from eastern Louisiana to South Carolina.

Elephantopus elatus is a perennial herb up to 70 cm (28 inches) tall. Leaves are oblanceolate, up to 20 cm (8 inches) long, darker on the upper side than they are on the lower side. The plant produces numerous small flower heads in a tight cluster, each head generally containing only 4-5 florets.

References

External links
Florida Native Plant Society
Florida Wildflowers Cooperative
Atlas of Florida Vascular Plants

Vernonieae
Plants described in 1850
Flora of the Southeastern United States
Flora without expected TNC conservation status